Kristoffer Olsen (8 August 1883 – 4 August 1948) was a Norwegian sailor who competed in the 1920 Summer Olympics. He was a crew member of the Norwegian boat Irene, which won the gold medal in the 8 metre class (1907 rating).

References

External links
profile

1883 births
1948 deaths
Norwegian male sailors (sport)
Sailors at the 1920 Summer Olympics – 8 Metre
Olympic sailors of Norway
Olympic gold medalists for Norway
Olympic medalists in sailing
Medalists at the 1920 Summer Olympics